Lake Temagami in Northeastern Ontario, Canada, has 1,258 surveyed and numbered islands, a handful of which are officially named:

Numbered islands

 island 76 Murchison Island

Officially named islands

References

Lake Temagami
Islands, Temagami